Manuel Ayerdi Olaizola (born 13 January 1967) is a Basque economist, politician, Minister of Economic Development and Business of Navarre and a member of the Parliament of Navarre. He was previously First Vice President of Navarre.

Early life
Aierdi was born on 13 January 1967 in San Sebastián (Donostia), Basque Country. In 1989, he received a degree in economics and business administration from the San Sebastián campus of the University of Deusto. He has a post-graduate degree (1996) in financial management in SMEs.

Career
Aierdi joined the marketing department of information and communications technology company Ibermática in 1989.  He was economic and financial director of Alcer, a construction company, from 1991 to 2001. He was also director of quality systems, prevention and environment at Alcer. Between 2001 and 2012, he was director of economic-financial and corporate services at Arian. He was Arian's legal representative in China between 2004 and 2011.

In the 1990s, Aierdi taught human resources management models at the University of Deusto's Faculty of Economic and Business Sciences.

Aierdi has been affiliated with the Basque Nationalist Party (EAJ) since 2003 and was an executive member of its Navarrese branch, the Napar Buru Batzarra (NBB), from 2008 to 2012. He was president of NBB from 2012 to 2015.

Aierdi contested the 2011 regional election in Navarre as an Nafarroa Bai electoral alliance candidate and was elected to the Parliament of Navarre. He was re-elected at the 2015 regional election as a Geroa Bai candidate.

In July 2015, he was appointed First Vice President of Navarre and Minister of Economic Development by President Uxue Barkos. He resigned from parliament on 27 July 2015. In his ministerial role, Aierdi has been president of various state-owned companies including Sodena, Cener and Naitec. He came under criticism after Sodena loaned €3 million to Davalor Salud, a company that was in financial difficulties and subsequently went into administration.

Aierdi was re-elected at the 2019 regional election. In August 2019, he was appointed Minister of Economic Development and Business by President María Chivite.

During COVID-19 pandemic in Spain, he tested positive for coronavirus on 14 March 2020.

Electoral history

References

External links

1967 births
Basque academics
Basque economists
Basque Nationalist Party politicians
Geroa Bai politicians
Government ministers of Navarre
Living people
Members of the 8th Parliament of Navarre
Members of the 9th Parliament of Navarre
Members of the 10th Parliament of Navarre
Nafarroa Bai politicians
Politicians from Navarre
People from San Sebastián
University of Deusto alumni
Academic staff of the University of Deusto
Vice Presidents of Navarre